The Lenoir Dow House is a historic house at 215 Adams Street in Waltham, Massachusetts.  The -story wood-frame house was built in 1888, during the building boom of the 1880s on Waltham's south side.  Built to house workers at the Waltham Watch Company, the house is a well-preserved Queen Anne Victorian, with an asymmetrical facade, hip roof topped by iron cresting, and a porch with ornate woodwork.  Lenoir Dow, the first owner, was a machinist.

The house was listed on the National Register of Historic Places in 1989.

See also
National Register of Historic Places listings in Waltham, Massachusetts

References

Houses in Waltham, Massachusetts
Houses on the National Register of Historic Places in Waltham, Massachusetts
Queen Anne architecture in Massachusetts
Houses completed in 1888